Wilhelmina "Willy" den Turk (3 April 1908 – 19 June 1937) was a Dutch swimmer. She won a gold medal in the 100 m backstroke and a silver in the 4×100 m freestyle relay at the 1927 European Aquatics Championships. The same year she set a world record in the 100 m backstroke. This was the first Dutch world record in a backstroke event, and it was bettered by another Dutch swimmer, Marie Braun.

Den Turk was selected for the 100 m backstroke and the 4×100 m medley relay at the 1928 Summer Olympics, but had to withdraw due to a foot injury. She retired shortly thereafter, married Henri Emil Lagerman in 1930, and in 1933 gave birth to a son. She died of a sudden illness, aged 29.

References

1908 births
1937 deaths
Dutch female backstroke swimmers
Dutch female freestyle swimmers
Swimmers from Rotterdam
European Aquatics Championships medalists in swimming
20th-century Dutch women